

Australia
 Norfolk Island
 Administrator – Robert Nixon Dalkin, Administrator of Norfolk Island (1968–1972)
 Head of Government – William M. Randall, President of the Island Council of Norfolk Island (1967–1974)
 Papua and New Guinea
 High Commissioner –
 David Hay, High Commissioner in Papua and New Guinea (1966–1970)
 Leslie Wilson Johnson, High Commissioner in Papua and New Guinea (1970–1974)

Denmark
 Faroe Islands
High Commissioner – Mogens Wahl, High Commissioner in the Faroe Islands (1961–1972)
 Prime Minister –
 Kristian Djurhuus, Prime Minister of the Faroe Islands (1968–1970)
 Atli Dam, Prime Minister of the Faroe Islands (1970–1981)

France
 Comoros
 High Commissioner – Jacques Mouradian, High Commissioner in the Comoros (1969–1975)
President of the Government Council –
 Said Mohamed Cheikh, President of the Government Council of the Comoros (1962–1970)
 Said Ibrahim Ben Ali, President of the Government Council of the Comoros (1970–1972)
 French Polynesia
 Governor – Pierre Louis Angeli, Governor of French Polynesia (1969–1973)
 French Territory of the Afars and the Issas
 High Commissioner – Dominique Ponchardier, High Commissioner in the French Territory of the Afars and the Issas (1969–1971)
 President of the Government Council – Ali Aref Bourhan, President of the Government Council of the French Territory of the Afars and Issas (1967–1976)
 Saint Pierre and Miquelon
 Prefect – Jean-Jacques Buggia, Governor of Saint Pierre and Miquelon (1967–1971)
 President of the General Council – Albert Pen, President of the General Council of Saint Pierre and Miquelon (1968–1984)
 Wallis and Futuna
 Administrator-Superior – Jacques Bach, Administrator Superior of Wallis and Futuna (1968–1971)
 President of the Territorial Assembly – Sosefo Papillo, President of the Territorial Assembly of Wallis and Futuna (1967–1972)

France and United Kingdom
 New Hebrides
British Resident Commissioner – Colin Allan (1966–1973)
French Resident Commissioner – Robert Jules Amédée Langlois (1969–1974)

New Zealand
 Cook Islands
 High Commissioner – Leslie James Davis, High Commissioner in the Cook Islands (1965–1972)
 Prime Minister – Albert Henry, Prime Minister of the Cook Islands (1965–1978)
 Niue
 Commissioner – Selwyn Digby Wilson, Resident Commissioner in Niue (1968–197?)
 Tokelau
 Administrator – Richard Basil Taylor, Administrator of Tokelau (1968–1971)

Portugal
 Angola
 High Commissioner and Governor-General – Camilo Augusto de Miranda Rebocho Vaz, High Commissioner and Governor–General of Angola (1966–1972)
 Cape Verde Islands
 Governor – Antonio Lopes dos Santos, Governor of the Cape Verde Islands (1969–1974)
 Macau
 Governor – José Manuel de Sousa e Faro Nobre de Carvalho, Governor of Macau (1966–1974)
 Mozambique
 High Commissioner and Governor-General –
 Baltazar Rebelo de Sousa, High Commissioner and Governor-General of Mozambique (1968–1970)
 Eduardo Arantes e Oliveira, High Commissioner and Governor-General of Mozambique (1970–1972)
 Portuguese Guinea – António de Spínola, Governor of Portuguese Guinea (1968–1973)
 Portuguese Timor
Governor – José Nogueira Valente Pires, Governor of Portuguese Timor (1968–1972)
 Portuguese São Tomé and Príncipe
 High Commissioner – António Jorge da Silva Sebastião, High Commissioner of São Tomé and Príncipe (1963–1972)

South Africa
 South West Africa
Administrator – Johannes Gert Hendrik van der Wath, Administrator of South West Africa (1968–1971)

Spain
 Spanish Sahara
Governor-General – José María Pérez de Lema y Tejero, Governor-General of Spanish Sahara (1967–1971)

United Kingdom
 Antigua
Governor – Sir Wilfred Jacobs, Governor of Antigua (1967–1993)
Premier – Vere Bird, Premier of Antigua (1960–1971)
 Bahama Islands
Governor – Francis Hovell-Thurlow-Cumming-Bruce, Baron Thurlow, Governor of the Bahama Islands (1968–1972)
Prime Minister – Lynden Pindling, Prime Minister of the Bahama Islands (1967–1992)
 Bahrain 
Chief Political Resident –
 Sir Stewart Crawford, Chief political resident of the Persian Gulf (1966–1970)
 Sir Geoffrey Arthur, Chief political resident of the Persian Gulf (1970–1971)
Political agent – Alexander John Stirling, British political agent in Bahrain (1969–1971)
Monarch – Sheikh Isa ibn Salman Al Khalifah, Hakim of Bahrain (1961–1999)
 Prime Minister – Sheikh Khalifah ibn Sulman Al Khalifah, President of the State Council of Bahrain (1970–present)
 Bermuda
 Governor – Roland Robinson, Baron Martonmere, Governor of Bermuda (1964–1972)
 Premier – Sir Henry Tucker, Premier of Bermuda (1968–1971)
 British Honduras
Governor – Sir John Warburton Paul, Governor of British Honduras (1966–1972)
Premier – George Cadle Price, Premier of British Honduras (1961–1984)
 British Solomon Islands Protectorate
Governor – Sir Michael David Irving Gass, Governor of the British Solomon Islands Protectorate (1969–1973)
 British Virgin Islands
 Governor – John Sutherland Thomson, Administrator of the British Virgin Islands (1967–1971)
 Chief Minister – Lavity Stoutt, Chief Minister of the British Virgin Islands (1967–1971)
 Brunei
High Commissioner – Arthur Robin Adair, British High Commissioner in Brunei (1968–1972)
Monarch – Hassanal Bolkiah, Sultan of Brunei (1967–present)
Chief Minister – Dato Pengiran Muhammad Yusuf bin Abdul Rahim, Chief Minister of Brunei (1967–1972)
 Cayman Islands
 Governor – Athelstan Charles Ethelwold Long, Administrator of the Cayman Islands (1968–1971)
 Falkland Islands
 Governor – Sir Cosmo Dugal Patrick Thomas Haskard, Governor of the Falkland Islands (1964–1970)
 Gibraltar
 Governor – Sir Varyl Begg, Governor of Gibraltar (1969–1973)
 Chief Minister – Robert Peliza, Chief Minister of Gibraltar (1969–1972)
 Gilbert and Ellice Islands
Resident Commissioner –
 Valdemar Jens Andersen, Resident Commissioner of Gilbert and Ellice Islands (1962–1970)
 Sir John Osbaldiston Field, Resident Commissioner of Gilbert and Ellice Islands (1970–1973)
 Grenada
 Governor – Dame Hilda Bynoe, Governor of Grenada (1968–1974)
 Prime Minister – Eric Gairy, Prime Minister of Grenada (1967–1979)
 Guernsey
 Lieutenant-Governor – Sir Charles Piercy Mills, Lieutenant-Governor of Guernsey (1969–1974)
 Bailiff – Sir William Arnold, Bailiff of Guernsey (1959–1973)
 Hong Kong
 Governor – Sir David Clive Crosbie Trench, Governor of Hong Kong (1964–1971)
 Isle of Man
 Lieutenant-Governor – Sir Peter Hyla Gawne Stallard, Lieutenant-Governor of Man (1966–1974)
 Head of Government – Norman Crowe, Chairman of the Executive Council of the Isle of Man (1967–1971)
 Jersey
 Lieutenant-Governor – Sir John Gilbert Davis, Lieutenant-Governor of Jersey (1969–1974)
 Bailiff – Sir Robert Hugh Le Masurier, Bailiff of Jersey (1962–1974)
 Montserrat
 Governor – Dennis Raleigh Gibbs, Administrator of Montserrat (1964–1971)
 Chief Minister –
 William Henry Bramble, Chief Minister of Montserrat (1960–1970)
 Percival Austin Bramble, Chief Minister of Montserrat (1970–1978)
 Pitcairn Islands
 Governor – Sir Arthur Norman Galsworthy, Governor of the Pitcairn Islands (1969–1973)
 Qatar
Political agent – Edward Henderson, British political agent (1969–1971)
 Monarch – Sheikh Ahmad bin Ali Al Thani, Hakim of Qatar (1960–1972)
 Prime Minister – Sheikh Khalifa bin Hamad Al Thani, Prime Minister of Qatar (1970–1995)
 Saint Christopher-Nevis-Anguilla
 Governor – Milton Allan, Governor of Saint Christopher-Nevis-Anguilla (1969–1975)
 Premier – Robert Bradshaw, Premier of Saint Christopher-Nevis-Anguilla (1966–1978)
 Saint Helena and Dependencies
 Governor – Sir Dermod Murphy, Governor of Saint Helena (1968–1971)
 Saint Lucia
 Governor – Sir Frederick Clarke, Governor of Saint Lucia (1967–1971)
 Premier – John Compton, Premier of Saint Lucia (1964–1979)
 Saint Vincent and the Grenadines
 Governor –
 Hywel George, Governor of Saint Vincent and the Grenadines (1967–1970)
 Sir Rupert John, Governor of Saint Vincent and the Grenadines (1970–1976)
 Premier – Milton Cato, Premier of Saint Vincent and the Grenadines (1967–1972)
 Seychelles
 Governor – Sir Bruce Greatbatch, Governor of the Seychelles (1969–1973)
 Chief Minister – James Mancham, Chief Minister of the Seychelles (1970–1976)
 Tonga
 Consul – Archibald Cameron Reid, British Consul in Tonga (1965–1970)
 Monarch – Taufa'ahau Tupou IV, King of Tonga (1965–2006)
 Prime Minister – Prince Fatafehi Tu'ipelehake, Prime Minister of Tonga (1965–1991)
 Trucial States
Political agent – Julian Bullard, British political agent (1968–1970)
 Turks and Caicos Islands
 Governor – Robert Everard Wainwright, Administrator of the Turks and Caicos Islands (1967–1971)

United States
 American Samoa
Governor – John Morse Haydon, Governor of American Samoa (1969–1974)
 Guam
 Governor – Carlos Camacho, Governor of Guam (1969–1975)
 Puerto Rico
 Governor – Luis A. Ferré, Governor of Puerto Rico (1969–1973)
 Trust Territory of the Pacific Islands
 High Commissioner – Edward Elliott Johnston, High Commissioner of the Trust Territory of the Pacific Islands (1969–1976)
 United States Virgin Islands
 Governor – Melvin H. Evans, Governor of US Virgin Islands (1969–1975)

References

Colonial governors
Colonial governors
1970